Medium Spicy is an Indian Marathi language film directed by 
Mohit Takalkar. The film stars Lalit Prabhakar , Sai Tamhankar and Parna Pethe. Music by Saurabh Bhalerao , Hrishikesh Datar and Jasraj Joshi. The film was released on 17 June 2022.

Synopsis 
This is the story of Nissim who is a chef by profession. Nissim falls deeply in love with Prajakta, who works at the front office of Nissim's hotel, who dreams of becoming an executive chef and moving to Paris. On the other hand, South Indian chef K. who works in the canteen of his own hotel. R. Gowri is in a different world. Gowri, who recently broke up, is friends with Nissim. Prajakta also comes close to Nissim, but as he does not express his feelings, she is ready to marry someone else. Gowri on the other hand also moves away from Nissim.

Cast 
 Lalit Prabhakar
 Sai Tamhankar
 Parna Pethe
 Ravindra Mankani
 Neena Kulkarni
 Neha Joshi
 Sagar Deshmukh
 Pushkaraj Chirputkar
 Arundathi Nag

Production 
Principal photography began on 21 May 2019, as informed by the makers. On 22 October 2019, entire shooting of the film has been wrapped up.

Soundtrack

Critical reception 
Medium Spicy film received mixed reviews from critics. Payal Shekhar Naik of Hindustan Times wrote "However, the grip of the actors on the boring story remains tight. And that is the best part of the movie". A Reviewer of Lokmat says "A must watch film for its attempt at a commentary on relationships by bringing characters of different temperaments together and for the excellent performances of the actors". Manisha Lakhe of Ott Play gave the film 3 stars out of 5 and wrote "Marathi cinema has raised expectations by gems like ,Court, Killa ,and even ,The Disciple,. This film is not your usual Rom-Com in the kitchen, and neither is it high Drama of the Ginsu knife, but it’s like the title: medium spicy, comfort food of the soul". Jaydeep Pathak of Maharashtra Times gave the film 3 stars out of 5 and wrote "In short, a 'medium spicy' dish moves in a 'medium' rhythm. She is definitely delicious. However, the whole game depends on developing a 'taste' for it". A Reviewer of Pune Mirror gave the film 4 stars out of 5 and says "‘Medium Spicy’ is a film that proves the saying ‘golden days of Marathi cinema are back.’ It handles an essential and complex topic in a beautiful way".

References

External links
 
 

2022 films
2020s Marathi-language films
Indian drama films